Bence Horváth may refer to:
 Bence Horváth (footballer)
 Bence Horváth (canoeist)